Albert Dominique Ebossé Bodjongo Dika (6 October 1989 – 23 August 2014) was a Cameroonian footballer who played in Cameroon, Malaysia and Algeria.

Career
Bodjongo played with his hometown club Douala Athletic Club, a club in MTN Elite Two, Cameroon's National Second Division. He also played for Coton Sport FC and Unisport Bafang in Cameroon.

He was signed by Malaysian club Perak FA on 15 April 2012 as a replacement for outgoing striker Lazar Popović.
He made his league debut for Perak in a 2–2 draw with Sabah FA on 17 April 2012 and scored his first goal for the club in a 2–2 draw with Terengganu FA on 4 May 2012.

In July 2013, Bodjongo signed for JS Kabylie (JSK). He was the top scorer of the Algerian Championship in 2014 with 17 goals.

Bodjongo reportedly had six caps with the Cameroon national football team (mainly with the 'B' team), and had also played for the under-20 team in 2009.

Death
On 23 August 2014, Bodjongo was struck on the head by a projectile thrown by an unknown person while the teams were leaving the field at the end of a home game between JSK and USM Alger. The match had ended in a 2–1 defeat, with Bodjongo contributing the sole JSK goal. Bodjongo died a few hours later in hospital of a traumatic brain injury. He was aged 24. Following Bodjongo's death, the Algerian Football Federation suspended all football indefinitely and ordered the closure of the 1st November 1954 stadium.

When the league resumed on Week 3 starting 12 September 2014, all matches on that week were preceded with a minute silence in memory of Bodjongo.

Subsequent coroners post-mortem results released on 18 December 2014, showed Bodjongo may have died from a severe beating and not from a projectile, which was the initial claim.

See also
 List of association footballers who died while playing

References

External links

1989 births
2014 deaths
Cameroonian footballers
Cameroonian expatriate footballers
Perak F.C. players
JS Kabylie players
Algerian Ligue Professionnelle 1 players
Expatriate footballers in Malaysia
Expatriate footballers in Algeria
Douala Athletic Club players
Association football players who died while playing
Sport deaths in Algeria
Footballers from Douala
Association football hooliganism
Coton Sport FC de Garoua players
Unisport Bafang players
Cameroon under-20 international footballers
Association football forwards
Cameroonian expatriate sportspeople in Malaysia
Cameroonian expatriate sportspeople in Algeria
Violent deaths in Algeria